When Legends Rise is the seventh studio album by American rock band Godsmack. It was released on April 27, 2018. It marks the band's first album away from heavy metal into a more hard rock sound. The album's first single, "Bulletproof", was released ahead of the album in February 2018. All four singles from the album reached number one on the US Billboard Mainstream Rock Songs chart. The album became certified Gold by the RIAA in September 2021 for selling over 500,000 copies.

Background
As early as 2015, frontman Sully Erna spoke of his desire to create a new sound for Godsmack in their next album. He expressed his desire to change how the band had been lumped into the heavy metal genre, and desired to branch out into a more hard rock sound. He later described the album in 2017 as a "reinvention" for the band, as a "new chapter" juxtaposed against older albums, of which he described as "vintage classic Godsmack". The band worked with music producer Erik Ron for the album in an effort to help the band approach the album from a new direction. Erna described the album: 

The first song recorded for the album with Ron was its first single "Bulletproof"; the band was so happy with the result that they worked with Ron on a second track, "Take It to the Edge". The production by Ron convinced the band to work with him on the entire album. Erna also produced.

Release and promotion
The album's name, When Legends Rise, and release date, April 27, 2018, were announced on February 28, 2018. The band released the first single, "Bulletproof", on the same date, and as of May 2018, had peaked at number one on the Billboard Mainstream Rock Songs chart. The title track "When Legends Rise" was released as a single on April 13, and was used by WWE as the official theme song for the 2018, 2019 and 2020 WWE PPV events that were held in Saudi Arabia. The 2018 MTV Movie & TV Awards used "Bulletproof" in the Best Villain montage to highlight Josh Brolin's performance as Thanos from Avengers: Infinity War while "When Legends Rise" was played in the Movie of the Year montage in the vignette for Black Panther.

In April 2020 the band released the official music video of "Unforgettable" that featured 400 middle school kids that were gathered by Sully to augment the band's performance of the song. The official video directed by Noah Berlow, who also assisted in the editing of the "Bulletproof" "Directors cut". The video was shot at the SNHU Arena in Manchester, New Hampshire.

The video directed by Noah Berlow and produced by Gautam Singhani completed a two-year process that had the band involving students, who starting the recording of this version of the song after 20 students first accompanied the band in the studio providing vocals on the chorus track. The same students received invitations to perform the song live onstage with Godsmack at a live show in Gilford, New Hampshire on August 22, 2018 at the Bank of New Hampshire Pavilion.

In 2019, the band proposed to the Gilbert H. Hood Middle School an enlistment of music students whom were trained and rehearsed with the band before the shoot to prepare for the music video filming.

During the band's visit, Sully personally spoke with and guided the students, sharing insights from his life and explained how music had saved him. Sully encouraged the young student musicians to continue the pursuit of their dreams.

As of October 4, 2020, the song had peaked at number 11 on the Billboard charts after spending the prior 11 weeks on the charts. The song has been at number 1 since May 2020 and has held that position for over five weeks.

Critical reception

AllMusic generally praised the album, describing the sound as "shedding some of the bitterness, anger, and aggression...without that violent anger and creeping darkness...what's left is a band that remains hungry and driven by hope" and concluded that album showed the band as "reinvigorated, confident, and no less defiant than they were in 1998. When Legends Rise is a slight shift, but a highly enjoyable one that stirs the soul in unexpected ways."

Track listing

Personnel

Godsmack
 Sully Erna – lead vocals, guitars, piano, producer
 Tony Rombola – guitars, backing vocals
 Robbie Merrill – bass, backing vocals
 Shannon Larkin – drums

Additional musicians
 The Gilbert H. Hood and West Running Brook Choir – additional vocals on "Unforgettable"
 Zvezdelina Haltakova – violin on "Under Your Scars"
 Irina Chirkova – cello on "Under Your Scars"

Production and design
Erik Ron – production, mixing
Anthony Reeder – engineer
Jerika Madnick – additional engineering
Ted Jensen – mastering
Troy Smith	– photography
John Feldmann – composition
Clint Lowery – composition

Charts

Weekly charts

Year-end charts

Certification

References

Godsmack albums
2018 albums
Albums produced by Erik Ron